Michelle Guerette (born October 6, 1980) is an American rower who competed in the Women's Quadruple Sculls event at the 2004 Summer Olympics in Athens, Greece. In the 2008 Olympic Games in Beijing, Guerette earned a Silver Medal in Women's Single Sculls, finishing less than half a second behind the winner, Rumyana Neykova.

After competing in the 2004 Olympics, she embarked on a solo career, and was the first pick for the U.S. team at the 2005 World Rowing Championships in Gifu, Japan, at which she placed third in the women's single sculls. The next year she placed fifth at the 2006 Championships in Eton, England.  She finished third again in 2007 in Munich, Germany.

She was born in Hartford, Connecticut, raised in Bristol, Connecticut.  She graduated from Harvard University in 2002.

References

 Guerette Finds Silver

External links 
 Michelle's U.S. Olympic Team bio
 U.S. Rowing bio

1980 births
Living people
American female rowers
Rowers at the 2004 Summer Olympics
Rowers at the 2008 Summer Olympics
Olympic silver medalists for the United States in rowing
Sportspeople from Hartford, Connecticut
Medalists at the 2008 Summer Olympics
Sportspeople from Connecticut
World Rowing Championships medalists for the United States
Harvard University alumni
Harvard Crimson women's rowers
21st-century American women